The 2022 North Texas SC season is the club's fourth season. The first three seasons North Texas SC competed in USL League One, including their championship year in the inaugural 2019 season. In December 2021, North Texas SC announced that they would compete in the inaugural MLS Next Pro season, a new division three league in American soccer.

Staff

Players

Competitive fixtures

MLS Next Pro Regular Season

MLS Next Pro play-offs

Standings — Western Conference

Statistics 

Numbers after plus-sign(+) denote appearances as a substitute.

Appearances and goals

|-

Top scorers
{| class="wikitable" style="font-size: 95%; text-align: center;"
|-
!width=30|Rank
!width=30|Position
!width=30|Number
!width=175|Name
!width=75|
!width=75|
!width=75|Total
|-
|1
|MF
|7
|align="left"|
|16
|0
|16
|-
|2
|FW
|9
|align="left"|
|9
|0
|9
|-
|3
|FW
|10
|align="left"|
|5
|0
|5
|-
|4
|FW
|22
|align="left"|
|4
|0
|4
|-
|rowspan="5"|5
|MF
|11
|align="left"|
|2
|0
|rowspan="5"|2
|-
|MF
|15
|align="left"|
|2
|0
|-
|FW
|17
|align="left"|
|2
|0
|-
|FW
|25
|align="left"|
|2
|0
|-
|MF
|41
|align="left"|
|2
|0
|-
|rowspan="4"|10
|DF
|4
|align="left"|
|1
|0
|rowspan="4"|1
|-
|MF
|6
|align="left"|
|1
|0
|-
|MF
|8
|align="left"|
|1
|0
|-
|DF
|18
|align="left"|
|1
|0
|-
!colspan="4"|Total
! 48
! 0
! 48
|-

Top assists
{| class="wikitable" style="font-size: 95%; text-align: center;"
|-
!width=30|Rank
!width=30|Position
!width=30|Number
!width=175|Name
!width=75|
!width=75|
!width=75|Total
|-
|1
|FW
|10
|align="left"| Hope Avayevu
|8
|0
|8
|-
|rowspan=2|2
|MF
|7
|align="left"| Bernard Kamungo
|5
|0
|rowspan=2|5
|-
|FW
|25
|align="left"| Collin Smith
|5
|0
|-
|4
|DF
|15
|align="left"| Isaiah Parker
|4
|0
|4
|-
|5
|DF
|9
|align="left"| José Mulato
|3
|0
|3
|-
|6
|FW
|17
|align="left"| Luis Cordosa Santos
|2
|0
|2
|-
|rowspan="8"|7
|DF
|4
|align="left"| Paul Amedume
|1
|0
|rowspan="8"|1
|-
|DF
|5
|align="left"| Chase Niece
|1
|0
|-
|MF
|6
|align="left"| Tómas Lacerda
|1
|0
|-
|MF
|8
|align="left"| Blaine Ferri
|1
|0
|-
|MF
|11
|align="left"| Andre Costa
|1
|0
|-
|DF
|12
|align="left"| Blake Pope
|1
|0
|-
|MF
|20
|align="left"| Alejandro Araneda
|1
|0
|-
|FW
|22
|align="left"| Pablo Torre
|1
|0
|-
!colspan="4"|Total
! 35
! 0
! 35
|-

Disciplinary record
{| class="wikitable" style="text-align:center;"
|-
| rowspan="2" !width=15|
| rowspan="2" !width=15|
| rowspan="2" !width=120|Player
| colspan="3"|MLS Next Pro
| colspan="3"|MLSNP Playoffs
| colspan="3"|Total
|-
!width=34; background:#fe9;|
!width=34; background:#fe9;|
!width=34; background:#ff8888;|
!width=34; background:#fe9;|
!width=34; background:#fe9;|
!width=34; background:#ff8888;|
!width=34; background:#fe9;|
!width=34; background:#fe9;|
!width=34; background:#ff8888;|
|-
|1
|GK
|align="left"| Felipe Carneiro
|2||0||0||0||0||0||2||0||0
|-
|4
|DF
|align="left"| Paul Amedume
|4||0||0||0||0||0||4||0||0
|-
|5
|DF
|align="left"| Chase Niece
|2||0||0||0||0||0||2||0||0
|-
|6
|MF
|align="left"| Tomas Pinheiro de Lacerda
|2||0||0||0||0||0||2||0||0
|-
|7
|MF
|align="left"| Bernard Kamungo
|1||0||0||0||0||0||1||0||0
|-
|8
|MF
|align="left"| Blaine Ferri
|5||0||0||0||0||0||5||0||0
|-
|9
|MF
|align="left"| José Mulato
|2||0||0||0||0||0||2||0||0
|-
|10
|FW
|align="left"| Hope Avayevu
|5||1||0||0||0||0||5||1||0
|-
|11
|MF
|align="left"| Andre Costa
|5||0||0||0||0||0||5||0||0
|-
|12
|DF
|align="left"| Blake Pope
|4||0||0||0||0||0||4||0||0
|-
|13
|GK
|align="left"| Antonio Carrera
|1||0||0||0||0||0||1||0||0
|-
|15
|DF
|align="left"| Isaiah Parker
|3||1||0||0||0||0||3||1||0
|-
|16
|MF
|align="left"| Carl Fred Sainté
|2||0||0||1||0||0||3||0||0
|-
|17
|FW
|align="left"| Luis Cordosa Santos
|3||0||0||0||0||0||3||0||0
|-
|18
|DF
|align="left"| Derek Waldeck
|3||0||0||0||0||0||3||0||0
|-
|20
|DF
|align="left"| Alejandro Araneda
|2||0||0||0||0||0||2||0||0
|-
|22
|FW
|align="left"| Pablo Torre
|2||0||0||0||0||0||2||0||0
|-
|25
|DF
|align="left"| Collin Smith
|9||0||0||0||0||0||9||0||0
|-
|26
|DF
|align="left"| Lucas Bartlett
|3||0||0||1||0||0||4||0||0
|-
|38
|MF
|align="left"| Santiago Ferreira
|3||0||0||0||0||0||3||0||0
|-
|42
|DF
|align="left"| Nolan Norris
|3||0||0||0||0||0||3||0||0
|-
|42
|DF
|align="left"| Lucas Bartlett
|0||0||0||1||0||0||1||0||0
|-
|45
|DF
|align="left"| Will Baker
|1||0||0||0||0||0||1||0||0
|-
|47
|MF
|align="left"| Jared Aguilar
|2||0||0||0||0||0||2||0||0
|-
|55
|MF
|align="left"| Alejandro Urzua
|1||0||0||0||0||0||1||0||0
|-
|colspan="3"|Total||69||2||0||3||0||0||72||2||0

Awards and Honors

MLS Next Pro Best XI

MLS Next Pro Save of the Year

References 

 

North Texas SC seasons
North Texas SC
North Texas SC
North Texas SC